The Samsung BlackJack, or Samsung SGH-i607, is a smartphone that was available through AT&T in the United States and Telstra in Australia.

Specifications
Specifications from the Samsung website:

 Screen resolution: 320 × 240 px, 2.25 inches
 Input method: QWERTY keypad
 Operating System: Windows Mobile 5.0 (upgrade to 6 is available)
 Processor: 220 MHz Texas Instruments OMAP 1710
 Storage: External microSD slot
 Flash Memory: 64 MB RAM, 128 MB ROM
 Modes: Quad-band GSM (850, 900, 1800, and 1900)
 Data connection: 3G (UMTS and HSDPA) and 2G (EDGE and GPRS)
 Bluetooth 2.0
 1.3 megapixel camera that can take photographs and videos
 Picture resolutions: 1280 × 960, 640 × 480, 320 × 240, and 176 × 144
 Video resolutions: 320 × 240, and 176 × 144
 2× digital zoom
 Self timer
 Brightness level adjustment
 Plays MP3, WMV, MP4 and 3GP media formats
 Battery: Removable 3.7 Volt Lithium-ion, 1,200 mAh, up to 5.5 hours of talk time and up to 11 days of standby
 Size: 4.45×2.32×0.4 inches
 Weight: 3.5 ounces

Brand controversy
In January 2007 Research In Motion, creators of the BlackBerry handhelds, filed suit in United States federal court claiming the BlackJack trademark was too similar to the BlackBerry mark. They alleged that Samsung had named their smartphone with a word beginning with "Black" just to mislead the customers that would come to the cellphone stores with the intention to purchase a BlackBerry.  A month later the two parties settled out of court. In January 2008, Rogers Wireless and Fido Solutions released the Blackjack II in Canada under the name Jack.

Hardware defect
For handsets manufactured between November 2006 and February 2007, there is a known defect in the antenna assembly, causing a large number of dropped calls.

Successor
The successor to the BlackJack was the Samsung BlackJack II. It was available in the U.S. for AT&T and in Canada for Rogers.

Awards
 Award Winner from CTIA (Cellular Telecommunications Industry Association). "Best hardware from Smartphone/PDA category."
 Winner of comparison review from 'Samsung BlackJack and RIM BlackBerry 8800' by Cnet.

References

External links
 Official Samsung Blackjack site
 Phone information on Samsung website
 Phone information on Phonescoop
 Reviews:  MobileTechReview, CNET, PC Magazine
Samsung "Jack" featured in PCWorld.ca's round-up of Top Canadian Smartphones and Cell Phones
 Samsung Blackjack support 

Samsung mobile phones
Mobile phones introduced in 2006
Windows Mobile Standard devices
Mobile phones with an integrated hardware keyboard